Pontevico is a comune in the province of Brescia, in Lombardy. It is situated on the left bank of the river Oglio. As of 2021 Pontevico had a population of 7,038.

Transportation 
Pontevico is served together with Robecco d'Oglio by a railway station (named Robecco-Pontevico) on the Brescia–Cremona line.

Sources

Cities and towns in Lombardy